María Esther Álvarez de Hermitte (1921-1990), commonly known as Esther Hermitte, was a social anthropologist from Argentina.

Early life and education 

Hermitte studied at the Faculty of Philosophy and Letters of the University of Buenos Aires. She completed a bachelor's degree in History and later specialized in Social Anthropology. After that she won a scholarship from the National Scientific and Technical Research Council (CONICET), which was directed by Bernardo Houssay.

Field work 

In 1958 Hermitte moved to the University of Chicago in the United States, where she assisted with the Social Systems courses. The following year she was sent to Mexico together with linguist R. Radhakrishnan and interpreter Alberto Méndez Tobilla to conduct field work with the Mayan community of Pinola, Villa Las Rosas in the state of Chiapas. As a result of several years of work and subsequent analysis of "Social mobility in a bicultural community in Chiapas" and "Supernatural power and social control", Hermitte received her degree of "Master of Arts" in 1965 and "Philosophical Doctor" in 1964. She received the Roy D. Albert Prize for her master thesis and the Bobbs Merryl Award for her doctoral thesis.

Publications
 Diario de campo, 2 vols. Inéd 1960-1.
 Movilidad Social en una comunidad bicultural, Revista Latinoamericana de Sociología, Centro de Investanciones Sociales del Instituto Torcuato Di Tella, Buenos Aires, 1968.
 Poder sobrenatural y control social: en un pueblo maya contemporáneo, Instituto Indigenista Interamericano, México, 1970.
 El concepto de nahual en Pinola, México, en Ensayos antropológicos en los Altos de Chiapas. McQuown & Pitt-Rivers comps., Instituto Indigenista Interamericano, México, 1989.

References 

 Hermitte, M. Esther Poder sobrenatural y control social.  Buenos Aires: Antropofagia, 2004

1921 births
1990 deaths
Argentine anthropologists
Argentine women anthropologists
University of Chicago alumni
University of Buenos Aires alumni
20th-century anthropologists
Argentine expatriates in the United States